Meyvan (also Romanized as Meyvān) is a village in Shiveh Sar Rural District, Bayangan District, Paveh County, Kermanshah Province, Iran. At the 2006 census, its population was 140, in 33 families.

References 

Populated places in Paveh County